"In My Dreams" is a song written by Paul Kennerley, and recorded by American country music artist Emmylou Harris.  It was released in March 1984 as the second single from the album White Shoes.  The song reached number 9 on the Billboard Hot Country Singles & Tracks chart.

Chart performance

References

1984 singles
Emmylou Harris songs
Songs written by Paul Kennerley
Song recordings produced by Brian Ahern (producer)
Warner Records singles
1983 songs